Cuicirama smithii is a species of beetle in the family Cerambycidae. It was described by Bates in 1881. It is known from Brazil.

References

Hemilophini
Beetles described in 1881